Melicope madagascariensis is a species of plant in the family Rutaceae. It is endemic to Madagascar and is used as a medical plant.

It reaches 10-20m height, flowers from November to January and fruits around March to June.

References

Endemic flora of Madagascar
madagascariensis
Plants described in 1882
Taxa named by John Gilbert Baker
Taxa named by Thomas Gordon Hartley